Víctor Hugo Sotomayor  (born 21 January 1968, in Córdoba) is a retired Argentine football player who played for a number of clubs both in Argentina and Europe, including Club Atlético Vélez Sársfield, Talleres de Córdoba and Hellas Verona F.C.

A central defender, Sotomayor also earned one cap for Argentina, which came against the Federal Republic of Yugoslavia on December 28, 1996.

External links
 
 Statistics at FutbolXXI.com 

1968 births
Living people
Footballers from Córdoba, Argentina
Association football defenders
Argentine footballers
Racing de Córdoba footballers
Club Atlético Vélez Sarsfield footballers
Talleres de Córdoba footballers
Hellas Verona F.C. players
FC Zürich players
Argentine expatriate footballers
Expatriate footballers in Switzerland
Expatriate footballers in Italy
Argentine expatriate sportspeople in Italy
Argentine Primera División players
Serie A players
Serie B players
Argentina international footballers